Kangyang station is a railway station in Onsŏng County, North Hamgyŏng, North Korea, on the Hambuk Line of the Korean State Railway.

History
It was opened by the Chosen Government Railway on 1 August 1933, together with the rest of the Tonggwanjin-Namyang section of the former East Tomun Line (Tonggwanjin-Unggi).

References

Railway stations in North Korea
Railway stations opened in 1933